Joachim Waroi (born September 20, 1988) is an association football attacker from the Solomon Islands who plays for Western United and the Solomon Islands national football team.

Club career

He is a Solomon Islands international.

He played for Hekari United.

Signed for Lae City Dwellers FC in 2016 for an anonymous fee to enhance their attacking options. He helped them qualify for the OFC Champions League for the first time.

Former Hekari United forward was given a one-match ban when celebrating a goal scored against his former club in an impudent manner by taking his jersey off and covering his head with it while running around which did not conform to the guidelines.

In 2019, he signed for Labasa F.C.

References

Living people
1988 births
Association football forwards
Solomon Islands footballers
Solomon Islands international footballers
Expatriate footballers in Papua New Guinea